The Town House may refer to:

Places
Townhouse Studios, recording studios in London, England officially named "The Town House"
The Town House (Los Angeles, California), listed on the U.S. National Register of Historic Places (NRHP)
The Town House (Springfield, Illinois), NRHP-listed

Other
 The Town House, 1959 historical novel by Norah Lofts